The following is a list of episodes from the series Final Space.

Series overview

Episodes

Pilot (2016)

Season 1 (2018)

Season 2 (2019)

Season 3 (2021)

Ratings

References

Lists of American adult animated television series episodes
Lists of American comedy-drama television series episodes
Lists of American mystery television series episodes
Lists of American science fiction television series episodes
Lists of Canadian animated television series episodes